Phaecasiophora niveiguttana, commonly known as the labyrinth moth, is a species of moth in the family Tortricidae. The MONA or Hodges number for Phaecasiophora niveiguttana is 2772.

References

Further reading

External links
 

Olethreutini
Moths described in 1873